The 1946 BYU Cougars football team was an American football team that represented Brigham Young University (BYU) as a member of the Mountain States Conference (MSC) during the 1946 college football season. In their sixth season under head coach Eddie Kimball, the Cougars compiled an overall record of 5–4–1 with a mark of 3–2–1 against conference opponents, finished fourth in the MSC, and were outscored by a total of 119 to 94.

Schedule

After the season

The 1947 NFL Draft was held on December 16, 1946. The following Cougars were selected.

References

BYU
BYU Cougars football seasons
BYU Cougars football